The General Council of the Bar, commonly known as the Bar Council, is the representative body for barristers in England and Wales. Established in 1894, the Bar Council is the 'approved regulator' of barristers, but discharges its regulatory function to the independent Bar Standards Board. As the lead representative body for barristers in England and Wales, the Bar Council’s work is devoted to ensuring the Bar’s voice is heard, efficiently and effectively, and with the interests of the Bar (and the public interest) as its focus.

History
The General Council of the Bar was created in 1894 to deal with breaches of a barrister's professional etiquette, something that had previously been handled by the judiciary. Along with the Inns of Court it formed the Senate of the Inns of Court and the Bar in 1974, a union that was broken up on 1 January 1987 following a report by Lord Rawlinson. The Courts and Legal Services Act 1990 designated the Bar Council as the professional body for barristers, with the role as a regulatory body being split off in 2006 to form the Bar Standards Board.

List of chairs

 ?–1899: Herbert Cozens-Hardy
1899–?: Joseph Walton
1913–18: Sir Paul Ogden Lawrence
1918–20: John Alderson Foote
1920–31: Sir Thomas Hughes
 1931–32: E. A. Mitchell-Innes
1932–46: Sir Herbert Cunliffe
1946–?: Sir Charles Doughty
1946–48: G. O. Slade
1948–52: Sir Godfrey Russell Vick
 1952–57: Sir Hartley Shawcross
 1957–58: Milner Holland
 1958–60: Gerald Gardiner
 1960–62: Geoffrey Lawrence
 1962–63: Sir Milner Holland
1963–66: Joseph Molony
1966–68: The Hon. H. A. P. Fisher
 1968–70: Desmond Ackner
 1970–72: John Arnold
 1973–74: James Comyn
1974–75: Patrick Neill
1975–76: Sir Peter Rawlinson
 1985–86: Robert Alexander
1987: Peter Scott
1988: Robert Johnson
1989: Desmond Fennell
1990: Peter Cresswell
1991: Anthony Scrivener QC
1992: The Lord Williams of Mostyn
1993: John Rowe
1994: Robert Seabrook
 1995: Peter Goldsmith
1996: David Penry-Davey
1997: Robert Owen
 1998: Heather Hallett
 1999 – Daniel Brennan
 2000 – Jonathan Hirst
 2001 – Roy Amlot
 2002 – David Bean
 2003 – Matthias Kelly
 2004 – Stephen Irwin
 2005 – Guy Mansfield
 2006 – Stephen Hockman
 2007 – Geoffrey Vos
 2008 – Timothy Dutton
 2009 – Desmond Browne
 2010 – Nicholas Green
 2011 – Peter Lodder
 2012 – Michael Todd
 2013 – Maura McGowan
 2014 – Nicholas Lavender
 2015 – Alistair MacDonald
 2016 – Chantal-Aimée Doerries
 2017 – Andrew Langdon
2018 – Andrew Walker
2019 - Richard Atkins QC
2020 – Amanda Pinto QC
2021 - Derek Sweeting QC
2022 - Mark Fenhalls QC

References

External links
Official website

1894 establishments in the United Kingdom
Bar of England and Wales
Organizations established in 1894
Regulators of barristers and advocates
Legal regulators of the United Kingdom
Law enforcement in Wales